Adams is a city in Adams Township, Mower County, Minnesota, United States.  The population was 787 at the 2010 census.

Geography

Demographics

2010 census
As of the census of 2010, there were 787 people, 304 households, and 188 families living in the city. The racial makeup of the city was 98.3% White, 0.5% from other races, and 1.1% from two or more races. Hispanic or Latino of any race were 1.7% of the population.

There were 304 households, of which 28.3% had children under the age of 18 living with them, 50.7% were married couples living together, 7.6% had a female householder with no husband present, 3.6% had a male householder with no wife present, and 38.2% were non-families. 34.5% of all households were made up of individuals, and 20.4% had someone living alone who was 65 years of age or older. The average household size was 2.30 and the average family size was 2.95.

The median age in the city was 46.6 years. 21.3% of residents were under the age of 18; 7.3% were between the ages of 18 and 24; 19.1% were from 25 to 44; 20.8% were from 45 to 64; and 31.4% were 65 years of age or older. The gender makeup of the city was 46.4% male and 53.6% female.

2000 census
As of the census of 2000, there were 800 people, 329 households, and 208 families living in the city. The racial makeup of the city was 99.25% White, 0.12% Native American, 0.38% Asian, 0.25% from other races. Hispanic or Latino of any race were 0.62% of the population.

There were 329 households, out of which 24.3% had children under the age of 18 living with them, 55.6% were married couples living together, 5.8% had a female householder with no husband present, and 36.5% were non-families. 35.0% of all households were made up of individuals, and 24.9% had someone living alone who was 65 years of age or older.  The average household size was 2.21 and the average family size was 2.85.

In the city, the population was spread out, with 20.9% under the age of 18, 6.5% from 18 to 24, 19.3% from 25 to 44, 17.0% from 45 to 64, and 36.4% who were 65 years of age or older.  The median age was 49 years. For every 100 females, there were 87.8 males.  For every 100 females age 18 and over, there were 80.9 males.

The median income for a household in the city was $31,289, and the median income for a family was $38,125. Males had a median income of $31,083 versus $22,639 for females. The per capita income for the city was $16,550.  About 4.4% of families and 6.3% of the population were below the poverty line, including 5.8% of those under age 18 and 8.2% of those age 65 or over.

History
The village of Adams was platted on January 30, 1868 by Selah Chamberlain. A two-room public school was built in 1869 and was later expanded to four rooms.  The village was officially incorporated on March 2, 1887. A water works system was installed in the summer of 1897.  A volunteer fire department was established as Adams Hose Co. No. 1 in 1898.  A sewage system was installed in 1902. A Catholic school was built in 1903 and roughly half of the public school students started attending there, greatly relieving overcrowding. The sewage system was updated in 1958. The town is in the Southland school district (which includes Southland High School), and is home to the varsity fields for the teams.

Notable people
Michael Kramer, Minnesota politician
Hubert H. Peavey, Wisconsin politician
Harvey B. Sathre, Minnesota politician

References

Further reading

External links
Adams official website

Cities in Minnesota
Cities in Mower County, Minnesota